This is a list of Superleague Formula broadcasters, that is, a list of broadcasting networks and media outlets which have shown coverage of Superleague Formula. Superleague Formula is covered regularly by such publications as Autosport magazine as well as offering applications such as live timing and live race video streaming from its official website. The series also operates several official social networking websites for its fans, including Twitter and Facebook. This list is accurate up to and including the final round of the 2010 championship at Navarra.

2008 International broadcasters

 Andorra: Cuatro
 Brazil: Sportv
 Cyprus: CytaVision
 France: Direct 8
 Greece: Alpha TV
 Italy: Sky Italia
 Middle East region: Abu Dhabi Sport
 Netherlands: RTL7
 Portugal: TVI
 Russia: 7TV
 Spain: Cuatro
 Sweden: Viasat Motor
 Turkey: Show TV
 UAE: Abu Dhabi Sport
 UK: Setanta Sports
 Rest of Europe: Eurosport 2

In addition Superleague Formula was also broadcast on many of the participating club's own networks including:

 A.C. Milan: Milan Channel
 Borussia Dortmund: BVB TV
 SC Corinthians: Timão TV
 CR Flamengo: Fla TV
 FC Basel: FCB Internet TV
 Galatasaray S.K.: Galatasaray TV
 Liverpool F.C.: LFC TV
 Olympiacos CFP: Sport TV
 PSV Eindhoven: PSV TV
 Rangers F.C.: Rangers TV
 R.S.C. Anderlecht: RSCA TV
 Sevilla FC: Sevilla TV

 An average of 6 million fans per race watched the 2008 Superleague Formula season. Superleague Formula's inaugural race at Donington Park was seen in 62 countries by a viewing audience of 100,000 people. 34,000 fans attended the last race of the season at Jerez, broadcast live in 70 countries.

2009 International broadcasters

 For the 2009 Superleague Formula season, the races were broadcast in 62 countries to a reach of 100 million people.
 Official race commentary on the SF World Feed same from Ben Edwards and Bruce Jouanny for every round of the season. Jonathan Green and Martin Haven have also featured in the commentary box. Ben Constanduros and Warren Pole were the pitlane reporters and interviewers.

2010 International broadcasters
 Prior to the opening round of the 2010 Superleague Formula season, Superleague Formula got a media deal with The NewsMarket to distribute video content to 25,000 global media outlets in over 190 countries for the duration of the season.
 The races had four different commentators on the SF World Feed: Ben Edwards spoke at six rounds, Martin Haven commentated at Silverstone and the Chinese races, Jonathan Green was at Jarama and John Hindhaugh did the Adria and Portimão rounds. Abi Griffiths became the new pitlane reporter, replacing Ben Constadanduros and Warren Pole. Co-commentators were Bruce Jouanny (rounds 1–6, 9, 11), Earl Bamber (rounds 7–8), María de Villota (round 8), Ho-Pin Tung (round 10) and Andy Soucek (Beijing round).

2011 International broadcasters
 Motors TV will screen live coverage of all twelve rounds of the 2011 season to viewers in Europe, having signed a deal for the first time with the series.
 Superleague Formula will be available to broadcast into as many as 400 million households worldwide for 2011. Deals have been struck with over 180 global territories to show live and delayed coverages of races in the series. Qualifying and the races, in partnership with Endemol Sport, will also still be shown live via the SF World Feed, as per in previous years.

References

External links
 Superleague Formula Official Website
 V12 Racing: Independent Superleague Formula Fansite Magazine

Broadcasters
Superleague Formula